This timeline is a chronology of significant events in the history of the U.S. State of Arizona and the historical area now occupied by the state.


2020s

2010s

2000s

1990s

1980s

1970s

1960s

1950s

1940s

1930s

1920s

1910s

1900s

1890s

1880s

1870s

1860s

1850s

1840s

1820s

1810s

1790s

1780s

1770s

1690s

1590s

1540s

1530s

1510s

1490s

Before 1492

See also

History of Arizona
Arizona v. United States
Government of Arizona
History of Flagstaff, Arizona
History of the Colorado Plateau
Index of Arizona-related articles
Indigenous peoples of the North American Southwest
List of cities and towns in Arizona
List of counties in Arizona
List of ghost towns in Arizona
List of governors of Arizona
Outline of Arizona
Southwestern archaeology
Territorial evolution of Arizona
Territory of Arizona
State of Arizona
Timeline of Arizona
Timeline of Arizona history
Timeline of women's suffrage in Arizona
Timeline of Mesa, Arizona
Timeline of Phoenix, Arizona
Timeline of Tucson, Arizona

References
References are included in the linked articles.

External links

State of Arizona website
Arizona Historical Society website

Timeline of Arizona history
Timeline of Arizona history
Timelines of states of the United States